Aparadhi is a 1976 Indian Kannada-language film, directed by Y. R. Swamy and produced by S. Heerabai. The film stars Srinath, Aarathi, Balakrishna and Narasimharaju. The film has musical score by Chellapilla Satyam. This film was the 500th Kannada film to be released.

Cast

Srinath
Aarathi
Balakrishna
Narasimharaju
Thoogudeepa Srinivas
Prabhakar
Jr. Shetty
N. S. Rao
Sharapanjara Iyanger
Thyagaraja Urs
Srinivasa Murthy
A. Padmanabha Rao
Kannada Raju
Sunitha
Mamatha Shenoy
B. Jayashree
Shanthi
Vajramuni in Guest Appearance
Lokanath in Guest Appearance

Soundtrack
The music was composed by Chellapilla Satyam.

References

External links
 

1976 films
1970s Kannada-language films
Films scored by Satyam (composer)
Films directed by Y. R. Swamy